Sandra Dijon (born 10 January 1976 in Fort-de-France, Martinique), for some time known as Sandra Dijon-Gérardin, is a French basketball player who played 133 matches for the French women's national basketball team from 2001–2008.

References

1976 births
Living people
Sportspeople from Fort-de-France
French women's basketball players
France women's national basketball team players